The Expedition of al-Muraysiʿ was an early Muslim campaign against the tribe of Banu Mustaliq which took place in December 627 CE.

The initial assault
According to Islamic sources, Banu Mustaliq supported Quraysh and joined it during the Battle of Uhud against the Muslims. It governed the main road leading to Makkah which acted as a strong barrier for Muslims preventing them from reaching Makkah.

Two months after Muḥammad returned from the Expedition of Dhū Qarad, he began to hear rumours that the Banū al-Muṣṭaliq were preparing to attack him, so he sent a spy, Buraydah ibn Al-Ḥasīb Al-Aslamī, to confirm this. The Banū al-Muṣṭaliq also believed that Muḥammad was preparing to attack them. So they in turn sent a spy reconnoiter to explore the positions of the Muslims, but he was captured and killed by them.

Muhammad attacked the Banu Mustaliq while they were inattentive and their cattle were drinking water. Knowing that, the Arabs that accompanied them defected and fled for their lives. Abu Bakr was entrusted as the commander of the Muhajir's (Emigrants), and Sa‘d bin ‘Ubādah was the commander of the Anṣar (Helpers). The two armies were stationed at a well called Al-Muraysī', near the sea, a short distance from Mecca. They fought with bows and arrows for an hour, and then the Muslims advanced so rapidly, they surrounded the al-Muṣṭaliq and took the entire tribe as prisoners, with their families, herds and flock. The battle ended in full victory for the Muslims.

'Alī ibn Abī Ṭālib killed a few wounded Banū al-Muṣṭaliq; among whom were Mālik and his son.

Two hundred families were taken as captives, two hundred camels, five thousand sheep, goats, as well as a huge quantity of household goods which were captured as booty. The household goods were sold in an auction to the highest bidder.

However, there is an accident during the battle where 'Ubadah ibn al-Samit unintentionally killed one of his Ansari clansmen, Hisham ibn Subabah by mistake since he thought Hisham was an enemy.

Juwayrīyah bint al-Ḥārith, daughter of the Banū al-Muṣṭaliq chief was one of the captives, and agreed to marry Muḥammad. Hadith; Juwayriyyah, daughter of al-Harith ibn al-Mustaliq, fell to the lot of Thabit ibn Qays ibn Shammas, or to her cousin. She entered into an agreement to purchase her freedom. She was a very beautiful woman, most attractive to the eye.
Aisha said: She then came to the Messenger of Allah (ﷺ) asking him for the purchase of her freedom. When she was standing at the door, I looked at her with disapproval. I realised that the Messenger of Allah (ﷺ) would look at her in the same way that I had looked.
She said: Messenger of Allah, I am Juwayriyyah, daughter of al-Harith, and something has happened to me, which is not hidden from you. I have fallen to the lot of Thabit ibn Qays ibn Shammas, and I have entered into an agreement to purchase of my freedom. I have come to you to seek assistance for the purchase of my freedom.
The Messenger of Allah (ﷺ) said: Are you inclined to that which is better? She asked: What is that, Messenger of Allah? He replied: I shall pay the price of your freedom on your behalf, and I shall marry you.
She said: I shall do this. She (Aisha) said: The people then heard that the Messenger of Allah (ﷺ) had married Juwayriyyah. They released the captives in their possession and set them free, and said: They are the relatives of the Messenger of Allah (ﷺ) by marriage. We did not see any woman greater than Juwayriyyah who brought blessings to her people. One hundred families of Banu al-Mustaliq were set free on account of her.

Altercation between the fighters on return to Medina
The army remained at the well of Al-Muraysī' for several days, during which an altercation ensued between the Muhājir and Anṣār. One of the Muhājirs, named Jahja, attacked an Ansārī, and the two groups immediately clashed, but the quarrel was broken up by Muḥammad.

'Abdullāh ibn ‘Ubayy, who was referred to as the head of the Hypocrites (al-Munāfiqūn) by Muslim historians, was furious for the challenge which the Muslims showed towards the hostile plans and vicious intrigues woven behind closed doors, and swore "the most honourable will expel the meanest out of Madinah", and added: "They (the Muslims) have outnumbered and shared us our land. If you fatten your dog, it will eat you." When that talk was reported to the Muḥammad, 'Umar asked for permission to have Ibn ‘Ubayy killed. Muhammad turned down his proposal on the grounds that it was not becoming for a prophet to be accused of killing his people.

'Abdullāh ibn Ubayy's son, who was also called 'Abdullāh, was angry at his father for the disrespect he showed. When the army reached Madinah, he drew his sword against his father and barred his father's entry into the town until he had confessed and declared that he himself was the meanest of the citizens of Madinah and that Muḥammad was the most honourable of them. The son was ready to cut off his father's head and bring it to Muḥammad, if he so wished.

He said, according to the Muslim Historian al-Ṭabarī:

According to the Sealed Nectar, Muḥammad did not punish Abdullāh ibn Ubayy in the public interest. 'Umar ibn Al-Khattāb asked Muḥammad why he did not accept his offer to kill him, to which he replied:

Islamic primary sources

Hadith literature
The event is mentioned in many collections of ḥadīth.
Ṣaḥīḥ al-Bukhārī  mentions the event as follows:

Ṣaḥīḥ Muslim ḥadith compilation also makes mention of some parts of the expedition:

Biographical literature
The event is mentioned in Ibn Hishām's biography of Muḥammad;, the Muslim jurist Ibn Qayyim al-Jawzīyah also mentioned the event in his biography of Muḥammad called Zād al-Ma'ād.

See also
List of battles of Muhammad
Muhammad as a general
Military career of Muhammad
Muslim–Quraysh War

Notes

Mubarakpuri, Safiur Rahman Al (2005)

627
Campaigns led by Muhammad